Hylodes pipilans is a species of frog in the family Hylodidae, known to occur near the Soberbo River at Serra dos Órgãos, municipality of Guapimirim, and in the municipality of Cachoeiras de Macacu, both located in the state of Rio de Janeiro, Brazil. It is diurnally active.

References

Hylodes
Endemic fauna of Brazil
Amphibians of Brazil
Amphibians described in 2007